Atta Muhammad Bhanbhro (1 February 1936 – 3 June 2020) also spelled as Atta Mohammad Bhambhro was a Pakistani writer, translator, poet, historian, lawyer, and the founder of Hoshu, a banned rebellious magazine. He wrote more than four hundred books on Sindhi literature, history including translations and civilization besides contributing to indus script through his writings. He was a wide studied man who claimed to read indus script found in moen jo daro but his research was not completed by him due to poority and government's little attention . Sometimes, he is referred to as archaeologist for his archaeological contribution excavated in Sindh.

Life and background 
He was born in a small village called Bachal Bhanbhro in Union Council Rasoolabad, Taluka Sobhodero, Khairpur district near village Mothparja. He completed his early schooling at his hometown. He obtained his undergraduate degree in Khairpur, and later moved to Karachi where he attended Sindh Muslim Law College and obtained Bachelor of Laws. After completing his education, he choose legal profession and started legal practice in Gambat city. He later started practice of law while serving as a junior lawyer with Shaikh Ayaz, a Sindhi poets of Pakistan. He had three sons and three daughters.

Career 
Between 1967 and 1968, Bhambhro started publishing a rebellious magazine called Hoshu which was later banned by the government of Pakistan in 1974 under the Defence law of Pakistan. After restrictions were imposed on the magazine, the pieces were later published in several other magazines, and the printing press responsible for publishing the magazine's remained work was also seized by the authorities and he went underground while the publisher and his uncle were arrested following the ban.

Literary work 
In 1980, he translated Iranian children’s literature and Russian literature into English language. In 1989 after residing in Hyderabad, he translated a book titled Sindh Ja Qadeem Asaar which was written on Sindh’s heritage. He then continued working as a translator and translated around one hundred books into Sindhi language, including Sindhu Likhat Ayein Boli, Sikandar Ji Kaah and Sindh Ji Tareekh Moarukhan Ji Zubani.

He wrote books on different subjects such as politics, culture, literature, history and archaeology. His publications included Hur Guerrilla Tehreek, America Ja Sindhi and Sindh Ji Fateh. Bhanbhro's notable contribution included a book titled 'Deciphering Indus Script' in Sindhi language as well as in English. It is believed he was the first Sindhi researcher who made an attempt to understand the Indus Script of ancient language. His book Sindhu Likhat Ji Bhaj (Deciphering Indus Script) has also been published. As an archaeologist, he excavated archaeological sites in Sindh and also wrote a book on the British strategy in the Sindh province. In one of his books titled the Hur Guerilla War he covered Hurs involving guerrilla warfare, and later wrote the Conquest of Sindh and the Islamic seminaries of Thatta.

During the Movement for Restoration of Democracy, a left–wing political alliance formed to end the military government of a Pakistani military dictator and then president general Muhammad Zia-ul-Haq, he was recognized as a poet for supporting the movement through his poetry.

Work

Awards 
He was the receipent of the Madar-i-Watan award given by the Sindh Taraqi Pasand Party, a left-wing Pakistani political party. During Pervez Musharraf's regime, he was nominated for the Pride of Performance award by Asif Ali Zardari, but he refused to accept it in protest of son's death who was abducted by unknown persons, and found dead with torture marks on his body. In 2004, he was awarded Latif Award in recognition of his work on Shah Abdul Latif Bhittai, a Sindhi Philosopher, scholar, saint, and poet.

Death 
Bhanbhro died in Bachal Bhanbhro village of Hingorja, Khairpur, Pakistan near village Mothparja on 3 June 2020. His will was revealed after his death which made Atta Muhammad Bhanbhro a topic of discussion and it also went viral on social media. According to his will, he is buried upside down so that he should continue to kiss his motherland Sindh until he himself is not decomposed into the sand. The second thing he said in his will was, his grave should be locked with chains and a banner should be pasted on this grave that a slave is buried here. The chains should not be opened until the Sindh is given freedom. The will went viral with the title "his lips kissed the soil of Sindh".

See also 
 Mothparja

References

1936 births
2020 deaths
People from Khairpur District
Sindh Muslim Law College alumni
Sindhi-language writers
Recipients of Latif Award